The Third Hasina Cabinet was the Government of the People‘s Republic of Bangladesh headed by Sheikh Hasina that was formed after the 2014 general election which was held on 5 January 2014. The Awami League was assured of victory, with its candidates declared victors in 127 of the 154 uncontested seats by default. The elected MPs and Cabinet were sworn in on 9 January.

Cabinet reshuffles
9 July 2015
 Sayed Ashraful Islam was made minister without portfolio after being relieved from the Ministry of Local Government and Rural Development and Co-operative.
14 July 2015
 Asaduzzaman Khan promoted from state minister to minister of home.
 Yeafesh Osman promoted from state minister to minister of science and technology.
 Nurul Islam became the minister of expatriates' welfare and overseas employment.
 Tarana Halim became the state minister of post and telecommunications.
 Nuruzzaman Ahmed became the state minister of food.
16 July 2015
 Sayed Ashraful Islam took the charge of Public Administration Ministry.
11 May 2016
 State minister of social welfare affairs, Promode Mankin dies in office.
19 June 2017
 Nuruzzaman Ahmed became the state minister of social welfare affairs.
16 December 2017
 Minister of Fisheries and Livestock Mohammad Sayedul Haque died in office.
3 January 2018
 Rashed Khan Menon transferred to social welfare ministry.
 A.K.M. Shahjahan Kamal became the civil aviation and tourism minister.
 Forest and environment minister Anwar Hossain Manju swapped portfolio with that of water resources minister Anisul Islam Mahmud.
 Tarana Halim transferred to the information ministry.
 Narayon Chandra Chanda promoted from state minister to the minister of the fisheries and livestock.
 Mustafa Jabbar appointed as the  posts, telecommunications and information technology minister.
 Kazi Keramat Ali became the state minister for Technical and Madrasa Education division.

Council of Ministers
Source:
Political parties
 
 
 
 
 

Other factions

State ministers

Deputy ministers

See also
 List of Bangladeshi governments

References

Cabinets established in 2014
Cabinets disestablished in 2019
Sheikh Hasina ministries